The silver real was the currency of the Spanish colonies in America and the Philippines. In the seventeenth century the silver real was established at two billon reals (reales de vellón) or sixty-eight maravedís. Gold escudos (worth 16 reales) were also issued. The coins circulated throughout Spain's colonies and beyond, with the eight-real piece, known in English as the Spanish dollar, becoming an international standard and spawning, among other currencies, the United States dollar. A reform in 1737 set the silver real at two and half billon reals (reales de vellón) or eighty-five maravedís. This coin, called the real de plata fuerte, became the new standard, issued as coins until the early 19th century. The gold escudo was worth 16 reales de plata fuerte.

History
Coins were produced at mints in Bogotá, Caracas, Guatemala City, Lima, Mexico City, Popayán, Potosí, Santo Domingo and Santiago. 
For details, see the: 
 Colombian reales
 Mexican reales
 Peruvian reales
 Santo Domingo reales
 Venezuelan reales

After the independence of Spain's colonies, the real was replaced by currencies also denominated in reales and escudos, including the Argentine real, Central American Republic real, Ecuadorian real, Honduran real, Paraguayan real and Santo Domingo real.

Coins
From 1572 to 1773 Spanish colonial silver coins were cobs. Initially cut from a silver bar and hammer struck on a coin die, they were accurate in weight, though sometimes debased in precious metal content. However unlike machined coins, they were often irregular in shape, especially if a too-thick coin was clipped by the mint to reach the proper weight. After 1732 similar, but better shaped cobs were produced on screw presses. When circulating in New England the larger coins might be cut to give intermediate values; since a real was nicknamed a "bit", the expression "two bits" came to mean a quarter dollar.

Unlike in Spain, the copper coins were generally not struck by the colonial mints. Exceptions were the Santo Domingo mint, which did strike maravedíes in the sixteenth century and the Caracas mint which issued fraction of real copper coins in the early nineteenth century to facilitate commerce.

See also

Currency of Spanish America
Peso
Spanish dollar
Spanish escudo
Spanish real
Viceroyalty

References

Modern obsolete currencies
Spanish colonization of the Americas
New Spain
Viceroyalty of Peru
Viceroyalty of New Granada
Viceroyalty of the Río de la Plata
Coins of Spain